Ellington is a typeface for display use designed by Michael Harvey licensed from Monotype. It was designed in 1990 and it is named after Duke Ellington. The face has a large x-height and combines  features of a modern serif typefaces with calligraphic elements.

See also 
Samples of display typefaces

References 

Monotype typefaces
Modern serif typefaces
Display typefaces
Typefaces and fonts introduced in 1990
Typefaces designed by Michael Harvey (lettering artist)